Moffett is a surname. Notable people with the surname include:

 Charles Moffett (1929–1997), American free jazz drummer
 Charnett Moffett (1967–2022), American jazz bassist, son of Charles
 Cleveland Moffett (1863–1926), American journalist, author, and playwright
 Doctor Charles Henry Moffet, fictional character in Airwolf
 D. W. Moffett (b. 1954), American actor
 David Moffett (b. 1957), Australian executive businessman
 Georgia Tennant (née Moffett) (b. 1984), English actress
 James Andrew Moffett, II (1886–1953), petroleum executive, chairman Bahrain Petroleum Company (BAPCO), California-Texas Oil Company, Ltd. (CALTEX), head of the Federal Housing Administration
 Judith Moffett (b. 1942), author of Pennterra, a science fiction novel
 Lacy Irvine Moffett (1878–1957), American missionary minister, ornithologist, and photographer.
 Peter Moffett (b. 1951), who acts under the stage name Peter Davison
 Sharyn Moffett (1936–2021), American child actor
 Thomas William Moffett (1820–1908), Irish scholar
 William A. Moffett (1869–1933), American admiral
 William Andrew Moffett (1933–1995), American historian and librarian

See also
 Moffat (surname)
 Moffatt (disambiguation)
 Moffitt (disambiguation)

de:Moffett